Clarence Charles William Henry Richard Bennett (May 21, 1870 – October 22, 1944) was an American actor who became a stage and silent screen actor over the early decades of the 20th century. He was the father of actresses Constance Bennett, Barbara Bennett and Joan Bennett with actress Adrienne Morrison, his second wife.

Biography

Bennett was born in Deer Creek Township, Cass County, Indiana, in May 1870. Called Clarence until he was 10, he was the eldest child of George Washington Bennett and Eliza Leonora Bennett. His younger sister was Ina Blanche Bennett. For a time, he was a sailor on Great Lakes steamer, a professional boxer, medicine showman, troubadour and night clerk in a hotel in Chicago.
Bennett made his stage debut on May 10, 1891, in Chicago, in The Limited Mail. He went to New York City, where his Broadway debut was in His Excellency the Governor (1899), which was produced by Charles Frohman. In his third Broadway production, he played the role of Father Anselm in Frohman's production of A Royal Family (1901–02).

Bennett was married to Grena Heller in 1901 in San Francisco. They soon separated and were divorced in 1903. Using her married name, she starred in a few plays on Broadway and went on to a successful career as a music critic for Hearst's New York American.

On November 8, 1903, Bennett and actress Adrienne Morrison were married in Jersey City. They had three daughters, all notable actresses: Constance Bennett, Barbara Bennett and Joan Bennett.

In 1905, Bennett won fame as the leading man, Hector Malone, Jr., in Shaw's Man and Superman. That was followed by his role as Jefferson Ryder in the stage hit The Lion and the Mouse (1905).

A series of spectacular roles followed. In 1908, he played the role of John Shand opposite Maude Adams in J. M. Barrie's What Every Woman Knows. Frequent quarrels between the stars occurred during the run of the play, and when Adams opened in Peter Pan, Bennett telegraphed his congratulations "on achieving your long ambition to be your own leading man."

Bennett is also known for adapting socially conscious works of Eugène Brieux, including Maternity.

In 1913, Bennett had a theatrical success starring as Georges Dupont in the stage drama Damaged Goods, which he also co-produced. He won a reputation for his curtain harangues, which friends—and critics—said were at least as good as his stage portrayals when he wound up an appearance by stepping in front of the curtain and castigating the police and courts for "narrow-mindedness". He developed this penchant until his ab-lib speeches won greater applause than many of the plays in which he acted.

Bennett reprised his stage role for his feature film debut, Damaged Goods (1914), which co-starred his wife, Adrienne Morrison. He helped adapt the screenplay and direct the drama. In the drama The Valley of Decision (1916), which he wrote, Bennett appeared on the screen with his wife Morrison and his three daughters.

In 1922, Bennett starred in Broadway's English-language version of Leonid Andreyev's melodrama He Who Gets Slapped, playing the title role as He. The success of the play led to a film adaptation by Metro-Goldwyn-Mayer, with Lon Chaney in Bennett's role.

Bennett and Morrison appeared together on stage in the 1923 play The Dancers. They were divorced in April 1925.

In 1925, he became acquainted with Aimee Raisch in San Francisco, during the production of Creoles, in which she played a minor role. She was a young socialite and aspiring actress who was divorcing her millionaire clubman and polo player husband, Harry G. Hastings.

Bennett and Raisch were married on July 11, 1927, in Chicago.

His daughter Joan made her stage debut acting with Bennett in Jarnegan (1928). This play, in which he played Jack Jarnegan, provided one of his favorite roles—that of a belligerent, drunken movie director given to acidulous and profane comments on Hollywood.

He and Raisch separated April 3, 1934, and were divorced in 1937.

With the advent of sound film, the middle-aged Bennett found a niche as a character actor. In 1931 he appeared with his daughter Constance Bennett in Bought. He played the dying millionaire John Glidden in the episodic If I Had a Million (1932) distributing million dollar checks to characters played by Gary Cooper, George Raft, and Charles Laughton, which also stars W. C. Fields. Bennett is probably best known for his role as Major Amberson in Orson Welles's second feature film, The Magnificent Ambersons (1942). Journey into Fear (1943), Welles's next production, was Bennett's final film.

Richard Bennett died at age 74 from a heart attack at Good Samaritan Hospital in Los Angeles. Episcopal funeral services were conducted on October 24, 1944, in Beverly Hills. He is interred in Pleasant View Cemetery, Lyme, Connecticut, beside his second wife and mother of his daughters.

Bennett was fond of saying that the movie industry was not a business, but a madhouse.

Select theatre credits

Selected filmography

Notes

References

External links

1870 births
1944 deaths
19th-century American male actors
American male stage actors
20th-century American male actors
American male film actors
American male silent film actors
Male actors from Indiana
Vaudeville performers